The 1949 Boston Red Sox season was the 49th season in the franchise's Major League Baseball history. The Red Sox finished second in the American League (AL) with a record of 96 wins and 58 losses, one game behind the New York Yankees, who went on to win the 1949 World Series.

The Red Sox set a major-league record which still stands for the most base on balls by a team in a season, with 835. Center fielder Dom DiMaggio had a 34-game hitting streak, which still stands as the club record for the major-league Red Sox.

Regular season 
During the season, Mel Parnell was the last pitcher to win at least 25 games in one season for the Red Sox in the 20th century. George Kell beat Ted Williams for the American League batting title by 0.0002 percentage points.

Ted Williams set a major league record for the most consecutive games reaching base safely with 84. The streak began on July 1, and ended on September 28. The streak was ended by Washington Senators pitcher Ray Scarborough. Williams was in the on-deck circle when Johnny Pesky made the final out, depriving him of one more chance to extend the streak.

The trade that wasn't 
In 1949, Boston Red Sox owner Tom Yawkey and Yankees GM Larry MacPhail verbally agreed to trade Joe DiMaggio for Williams, but MacPhail refused to include Yogi Berra.

Yankees and Red Sox toe-to-toe 
Joe DiMaggio came back from heel surgery to demolish the Red Sox in a three-game series at Fenway Park. He hit four home runs, three of them game winners. It sent the Sox reeling, and they fell 12.5 games back by July 4. But Boston rallied after that, going 60-21 (.741) in their next 81 games, and they consequently went into Yankee Stadium for the final two games of the schedule with a one-game lead. The Red Sox needed just one win in two games and were to pitch Mel Parnell in the first game. After trailing 4–0, the Yankees came back to beat Parnell 5–4, as Johnny Lindell hit an eighth-inning, game-winning, home run and Joe Page had a great relief appearance for New York. And so it came down to the last game of the season. It was Ellis Kinder facing Vic Raschi.

The Yankees led 1–0 after seven innings, having scored in the first. In the eighth inning, Red Sox manager Joe McCarthy lifted Kinder for pinch hitter Tom Wright, who walked but was then erased on a double play. With Kinder out of the game, McCarthy then brought in Mel Parnell in relief, even though Parnell had pitched 4 innings the previous day (in which he had given up 8 hits, two walks and four runs).  Parnell immediately yielded a homer to Tommy Henrich and a single to Yogi Berra, and after those two batters was quickly replaced by Tex Hughson, who had been on the disabled list and said his arm still hurt. But he came on and, with the bases loaded, Jerry Coleman hit a soft liner that Al Zarilla in right field tried to make a shoestring catch, but he missed and it went for a triple and three runs.

In the ninth inning the Red Sox rallied for three runs but still fell short.  McCarthy was criticized for pinch-hitting for Kinder,  particularly when there were no fully-rested, effective arms in the bullpen to replace Kinder on the mound. Hughson also claimed his manager ruined his career by making him pitch with a sore arm—Hughson, an eight-year Red Sox veteran, never again appeared in the major leagues after this game.

It was the second year in a row McCarthy's late-season managing was called into question. In 1948, McCarthy had chosen journeyman pitcher Denny Galehouse to start the tie breaker that decided who went to the 1948 World Series, and the Red Sox lost that tiebreaker to the Cleveland Indians.

Season standings

Record vs. opponents

Opening Day lineup

Notable transactions 
 November 15, 1948: Wally Moses was released by the Red Sox.
 November 24, 1948: Ray Jablonski was drafted from the Red Sox by the St. Louis Cardinals in the 1948 minor league draft.

Roster

Player stats

Batting

Starters by position 
Note: Pos = Position; G = Games played; AB = At bats; H = Hits; Avg. = Batting average; HR = Home runs; RBI = Runs batted in

Other batters 
Note: G = Games played; AB = At bats; H = Hits; Avg. = Batting average; HR = Home runs; RBI = Runs batted in

Pitching

Starting pitchers 
Note: G = Games pitched; IP = Innings pitched; W = Wins; L = Losses; ERA = Earned run average; SO = Strikeouts

Other pitchers 
Note: G = Games pitched; IP = Innings pitched; W = Wins; L = Losses; ERA = Earned run average; SO = Strikeouts

Relief pitchers 
Note: G = Games pitched; W = Wins; L = Losses; SV = Saves; ERA = Earned run average; SO = Strikeouts

Awards and honors 
 Ted Williams, OF, American League MVP
 Ted Williams, American League leader, home runs (43) and runs batted in (159)
 Ted Williams, Major League record, Most consecutive games reached base safely (84).

Farm system 

LEAGUE CHAMPIONS: San Jose, Marion

References

External links
1949 Boston Red Sox team page at Baseball Reference
1949 Boston Red Sox season at baseball-almanac.com

 

Boston Red Sox seasons
Boston Red Sox
Boston Red Sox
1940s in Boston